Podyuga is a rural locality (a settlement) and the administrative center of Podyuzhskoye Rural Settlement, Konoshsky District of Arkhangelsk Oblast, Russia.

Geography 
It is located on the Podyuga River.

References

Rural localities in Konoshsky District